Omer Meir Wellber (Hebrew: עומר מאיר ולבר; born 28 October 1981, Beersheba) is an Israeli conductor and composer.

Biography
Wellber began musical studies at age 5, on accordion and piano.  He became a composition student of Tania Taler at age 9.  He attended the music conversatory in Be'er Sheva, and graduated from there in 1999.  He subsequently studied composition with Michael Wolpe, and continued studies on a scholarship from the American-Israel Cultural Foundation to continue his studies with Eugene Zirlin at the Jerusalem Music Academy and in the Mendi Rodan Programme.  His compositions include:
 Suite for String Orchestra, Bassoon and Clarinet No. 1
 Mandolin Concerto
 Music for Ten Instruments
 Oboe Quintet (The Last Leaf)
 Viola Concerto

He is Music Director of the Volksoper Wien and Music Director of the Teatro Massimo Palermo and Artistic Director of the Toscanini Festival. He was First Guest Conductor of the Semperoper Dresden until 2022 and Chief Conductor of the BBC Philharmonic until 2022. From 2008 to 2010, Wellber was an assistant conductor to Daniel Barenboim at the Staatsoper Unter den Linden and at the Teatro alla Scala in Milan.  In 2009, he became music director of the Ra'anana Symphonette Orchestra.  From 2011 to 2014, Wellber was music director of the Palau de les Arts Reina Sofia.  This appointment was unusual in that Wellber had not conducted with the company prior to his appointment.  In 2015, Wellber, Jacob Reuven and the Rahat-based Bedouin nonprofit A New Dawn in the Negev initiated the "Sarab - Strings of change" music education programme.

In March 2018, Wellber first guest-conducted the BBC Philharmonic.  On the basis of this appearance, in October 2018, the orchestra announced the appointment of Wellber as its next chief conductor, effective with the 2019-2020 season, with an initial contract of 4 years.  Following his withdrawal from his two scheduled 2022 Proms appearances, Wellber is no longer listed as affiliated with the BBC Philharmonic as of the summer of 2022.  In July 2018, the Teatro Massimo di Palermo announced the appointment of Wellber as its next music director, effective January 2020.  He became principal guest conductor of the Semperoper Dresden as of the 2018-2019 season.  In December 2020, the Vienna Volksoper announced the appointment of Wellber as its next music director, effective 1 September 2022, with an initial contract of 5 years.  In February 2023, the city of Hamburg announced the appointment of Wellber as its new Generalmusikdirektor (GMD), whose duties include the Hamburg State Opera and the Philharmonisches Staatsorchester Hamburg, effective with the 2025-2026 season.

Wellber's commercial recordings include Gioia, with Aleksandra Kurzak (Decca), DVD recordings of Eugene Onegin (C Major Entertainment) and of Aida (BelAir Classiques).

Wellber and his family make their home in Milan.

References

External links
 Official webpage of Omer Meir Wellber
 IMG Artists agency page on Omer Meir Wellber
 Nicholas Mathias agency page on Omer Meir Wellber
 'Omer Meir Wellber in Munich, Birmingham, and Vienna'.  PR2 Classic press release, via Musical America, 16 September 2015

Israeli conductors (music)
Living people
1981 births
21st-century conductors (music)